Brywood Park is located in the Northwood community in the city of Irvine in Orange County, California, United States. The park sits next to Brywood Elementary School on the corner of Bryan and Westwood.

Park amenities
 2 drinking fountains
 1 child play area
 1 open play area
 1 soccer field
 2 ball diamonds
 6 barbecue grills
 1 group picnic area

Geography of Irvine, California
Parks in Orange County, California
Municipal parks in California